The 1931–32 Prima Divisione was the third level league of the 32nd Italian football championship.

In 1928, FIGC had decided a reform of the league structure of Italian football. The top-level league was the National Division, composed by the two divisions of Serie A and Serie B. Under them, there were the local championship, the major one being the First Division, that in 1935 will take the name of Serie C. Starting from 1930-31 season, the winners of the six groups of First Division would be admitted to the final rounds, where three tickets of promotion to Serie B were available, whereas the scheduled relegations were annulled by the Federation which expanded the division.

Teams 
The championship rose from 80 to 90 clubs with a special guest. Five new teams had arrived from the regional leagues.

Regulation 
Six groups of 15 teams with two three final groups, thirty-six matchdays. Final group winners were promoted, ultimate clubs in the regular season should be relegated.

Girone A

Final classification

Results

Girone B

Final classification

Results

Girone C

Final classification

Results

Girone D

Final classification

Results

Girone E

Final classification

Results

Girone F

Final classification

Results

Final rounds

Girone A

Girone B

Girone C

Serie C seasons
3
Italy